Cryptophagus corticinus is a species of silken fungus beetle in the family Cryptophagidae. It is found in North America and Europe.

References

Further reading

External links

 

Cryptophagidae
Articles created by Qbugbot
Beetles described in 1863